Kent Matsuoka is an American born independent producer and location manager of Japanese (nisei) descent.   Born in Sacramento, California, he studied film and photography at the California Institute of the Arts.

As a location scout in Hollywood, he has scouted for Burlesque, Castle, Changling, The Fighter, The Hangover Part III, Hawaii Five-0, The Last Ship and commercials for brands such as Apple, ExxonMobil, Ford, Hyundai, Mountain Dew, Nike, Pepsi, Verizon and others.

Matsuoka was honored with a California on Location Award (COLA) for Commercial Location Professional of the Year in 2010, a COLA nomination in 2013, and a nomination for the inaugural Location Managers Guild Award for Commercial Location Professional in 2014.

He has also been responsible for producing many print editorials, advertising, commercials, the Roger Corman feature Supergator, served on the board of the Location Managers Guild of America, and on the Teamster 399 steering committee.

Filmography 

Mindhunter (2015) location scout
Doll & Em (2015) Los Angeles location manager
Revolution (2014) 2nd unit location manager
The Hangover Part III (2013) key assistant location manager
Hawaii Five-0 (2011) key assistant location manager
Burlesque (2010) key assistant location manager
A Single Man (2010) location scout
Castle (2009) location scout
Hannah Montana: The Movie (2009) location scout
State of Play (2009) location scout
He's Just Not That into You (2009) location scout
Role Models (2008) location scout: additional photography
Dirty Sexy Money (2008) location scout
Changeling (2008) assistant location manager
Supergator (2007) associate producer
Death Proof (2007) assistant location manager
The Number 23 (2007) assistant location manager
The Holiday (2006) assistant location manager
Alias (2005) water safety
CSI: Miami (2005) water safety

References

External links 

Location Manager Guild of America

1974 births
American people of Japanese descent
American film producers
California Institute of the Arts alumni
Living people